Álvaro Barba López (born 17 February 1984 in Seville) is a Spanish racing driver and brother to fellow racer Marco Barba.

Career

Formula Junior and Spanish Formula Three

Barba began his single seater career in 2002 driving in the Spanish Formula Junior 1600 series, where he finished runner up to fellow countryman Adrián Vallés. In 2003 he moved up to the Spanish Formula Three Championship, the first of three seasons in the category. During his time in the series he accumulated nine podium positions, including three race wins, with his best season coming in 2005 when he finished 5th in the championship. He also raced in that year's Marlboro Masters event at Zandvoort, finishing in 24th place.

Formula Renault 3.5 Series

In 2003 Barba raced a full season in the World Series Lights championship, which acted as a support event to the World Series by Nissan. Barba took two podium positions during the year to finish 10th overall. 

In 2006 he stepped up to the Formula Renault 3.5 Series with the Swiss team Jenzer Motorsport, taking nine points to finish his debut season 26th overall. He joined top Italian team International DracoRacing for the 2007 season, taking two podium positions, including his first race win at Donington Park. He finished the season 8th overall.

For 2008, Barba continued in the World Series, this time switching to the Italian squad Prema Powerteam, with his brother Marco taking over his seat at Draco Racing. After taking a podium in the opening event of the season, he took a further three podium places and a fastest lap to be classified 10th in the championship.

International GT Open
In July 2008, he teamed up with his brother to race a Mosler MT900R in the International GT Open event held at the brand new Valencia Street Circuit, and in December 2008, it was announced that Barba will race for the Advanced Engineering team in the 2009 season.

Career results

Career summary

Complete Formula Renault 3.5 Series results
(key) (Races in bold indicate pole position) (Races in italics indicate fastest lap)

Notes

References

External links
 Official website: 
 Career details:

1984 births
Living people
Sportspeople from Seville
Spanish racing drivers
Euroformula Open Championship drivers
FIA GT Championship drivers
World Series Formula V8 3.5 drivers
Eurocup Mégane Trophy drivers
International GT Open drivers
24 Hours of Spa drivers
Prema Powerteam drivers
Drivex drivers
Campos Racing drivers
Jenzer Motorsport drivers
Draco Racing drivers
Ombra Racing drivers
Hitech Grand Prix drivers
AF Corse drivers